Skúli Mogensen (born 18 September 1968) is an Icelandic investor and entrepreneur. He owns the investment firm Títan, founded and OZ Communications, and founded and was sole owner and CEO of the Iceland-based budget airline WOW air, which went bankrupt on 28 March 2019.

Early life and education
Skúli's mother, Anna Skúladóttir, is a former financial director for the city of Reykjavík; his father, Brynjólfur Mogensen, is an orthopedist and Skúli spent much of his childhood in Sweden while his father was studying there. He was an exchange student in San Diego in California, then studied philosophy at the University of Iceland; he co-founded his first business, OZ Communications, as a student and dropped out when the company took off.

Career 
Skúli served as CEO of OZ for 18 years until the company was sold to Nokia in 2008. He was among the founders of Scandic hf. (in 1993), Íslandssími and Arctic Ventures. He registered Títan investment firm in Iceland in October 2009; in 2011 Skúli led a buyout of MP Bank.

He founded WOW air in November 2011, and took over as CEO from Baldur Baldursson the following year. On 28 March 2019, the day the company ceased operations, he wrote a letter to employees apologising "for not taking action sooner".
WOW air was named Low Cost Airline of the year in 2018 by CAPA.

Skúli was a board member at Securitas, MP Bank, Kvika bank, Datamarket, Redline Communications, Carbon Recycling International, Thor Datacenter and other companies.

Skúli is founder and CEO of Títan Fjárfestingarfélag which is his private investment firm with holdings primarily in the travel, tourism and leisure markets along with real estate investments.

Skúli Mogensen was named Iceland's Businessman of the Year in 2011 and 2016.
Skúli Mogensen was awarded IMARKs marketing person of the year 2017

Private life 
He was formerly married to Margrét Ásgeirsdóttir, a physician; they moved to Canada in 2002, while he was running OZ, and lived there until 2010. They have three children and divorced in 2013.

References

Living people
Skuli Mogensen
1968 births
WOW air
Chief executives in the airline industry
21st-century Icelandic businesspeople
Skuli Mogensen
Skuli Mogensen